Union County Airport , also known as Troy Shelton Field, is a county-owned, public-use airport located one nautical mile (2 km) southwest of the central business district of Union, a city in Union County, South Carolina, United States. It is included in the National Plan of Integrated Airport Systems for 2011–2015, which categorized it as a general aviation facility.

Facilities and aircraft 
The airport covers an area of 64 acres (26 ha) at an elevation of 610 feet (186 m) above mean sea level. It has one runway designated 5/23 with an asphalt surface measuring 3,508 by 60 feet (1,069 x 18 m).

For the 12-month period ending October 8, 2010, the airport had 6,500 general aviation aircraft operations, an average of 17 per day. At that time there were 18 aircraft based at this airport: 94% single-engine and 6% multi-engine.

References

External links 
 Union County, Troy Shelton Field (35A) at South Carolina Aeronautics Commission
 Aerial image as of January 2000 from USGS The National Map
 
 

Airports in South Carolina
Transportation in Union County, South Carolina